The Araceae are a family of monocotyledonous flowering plants in which flowers are borne on a type of inflorescence called a spadix. The spadix is usually accompanied by, and sometimes partially enclosed in, a spathe (or leaf-like bract). Also known as the arum family, members are often colloquially known as aroids. This family of 140 genera and about 4,075 known species is most diverse in the New World tropics, although also distributed in the Old World tropics and northern temperate regions.

Many species display very decorative leaves and flowers, and they are widely used for gardening; popular as indoor plants and also outdoor plants where climates are mild, and winter freezes will not generally occur. However, some temperate species are also very popular in Mediterranean-climate gardening, or in moderately cool temperate zones, such as Zantedeschia.

Description

Species within Araceae are often rhizomatous or tuberous, and the leaves nearly always contain calcium oxalate crystals or raphides, in varying degrees.  The leaves can vary considerably from species to species. The inflorescence is composed of a spadix, which is almost always surrounded by a modified leaf called a spathe.  In monoecious aroids (possessing separate male and female flowers, but with both flowers present on one plant), the spadix is usually organized with female flowers towards the bottom, and male flowers towards the top. In aroids with perfect flowers, the stigma is no longer receptive when the pollen is released, thus preventing self-fertilization. Some species are dioecious.

Many plants in this family are thermogenic (heat-producing). Their flowers can reach up to 45 °C even when the surrounding air temperature is much lower. One reason for this unusually high temperature is to attract insects (usually beetles) to pollinate the plant, rewarding the beetles with heat energy. Another reason is to prevent tissue damage in cold regions. Some examples of thermogenic Araceae are: Symplocarpus foetidus (eastern skunk cabbage), Amorphophallus titanum (titan arum), Amorphophallus paeoniifolius (elephant foot yam), Helicodiceros muscivorus (dead horse arum lily), and Sauromatum venosum (voodoo lily). Some species, such as titan arum and the dead horse arum, give off a very pungent smell akin to rotten meat, which serves to attract flies for pollination. The heat produced by the plant helps to convey the scent further.

Toxicity

Within the Araceae, genera such as Alocasia, Arisaema, Caladium, Colocasia, Dieffenbachia, Syngonium, Epipremnum, Aglaonema and Philodendron contain calcium oxalate crystals in the form of raphides. When accidentally consumed, these may cause edema, vesicle formation, and dysphagia, accompanied by painful stinging and burning in the mouth and throat, with symptoms occurring for up to two weeks after ingestion. Patients report feeling a mild to extreme sensation of sand or glass in the esophagus and mouth, depending on amount ingested.

Taxonomy

Phylogeny
Phylogeny based on the Angiosperm Phylogeny Website.

Classification
One of the earliest observations of species in the Araceae was conducted by Theophrastus in his work Enquiry into Plants.  The Araceae were not recognized as a distinct group of plants until the 16th century. In 1789, Antoine Laurent de Jussieu classified all climbing aroids as Pothos and all terrestrial aroids as either Arum or Dracontium in his book Familles des Plantes.

The first major system of classification for the family was produced by Heinrich Wilhelm Schott, who published Genera Aroidearum in 1858 and Prodromus Systematis Aroidearum in 1860. Schott's system was based on floral characteristics, and used a narrow conception of a genus. Adolf Engler produced a classification in 1876, which was steadily refined up to 1920. His system is significantly different from Schott's, being based more on vegetative characters and anatomy. The two systems were to some extent rivals, with Engler's having more adherents before the advent of molecular phylogenetics brought new approaches.

A comprehensive taxonomy of Araceae was published by Mayo et al. in 1997.

Modern studies based on gene sequences show the Araceae (including the Lemnoideae, duckweeds) to be monophyletic, and the first diverging group within the Alismatales. The APG III system of 2009 recognizes the family, including the genera formerly segregated in the Lemnaceae. The sinking of the Lemnaceae into the Araceae was not immediately universally accepted. For example, the 2010 New Flora of the British Isles used a paraphyletic Araceae and a separate Lemnaceae. However Lemna and its allies were incorporated in Araceae in the 2019 edition. A comprehensive genomic study of Spirodela polyrhiza was published in February 2014.

Genera

Anthurium and Zantedeschia are two well-known members of this family, as are Colocasia esculenta (taro) and Xanthosoma roseum (elephant ear or ‘ape). The largest unbranched inflorescence in the world is that of the arum Amorphophallus titanum (titan arum).  The family includes many ornamental plants: Dieffenbachia, Aglaonema, Caladium, Nephthytis, and Epipremnum, to name a few. The genera Cryptocoryne, Anubias and Bucephalandra  are many popular aquarium plants. Philodendron is an important plant in the ecosystems of the rainforests and is often used in home and interior decorating. Symplocarpus foetidus (skunk cabbage) is a common eastern North American species. An interesting peculiarity is that this family includes the largest unbranched inflorescence, that of the titan arum, often erroneously called the "largest flower" and the smallest flowering plant and smallest fruit, found in the duckweed, Wolffia.

Fossil record

The family Araceae has one of the oldest fossil record among angiosperms, with fossil forms first appearing during the Early Cretaceous epoch. Notable fossils from the Early Cretaceous include: Spixiarum kipea, an aroid from the late Aptian of Brazil; Orontiophyllum ferreri, an aroid leaf from the late Albian of Spain; and Turolospadix bogneri, an aroid spadix from the late Albian of Spain.

Food plants

Food plants in the family Araceae include Amorphophallus paeoniifolius (elephant foot yam), Colocasia esculenta (kochu, taro, dasheen), Xanthosoma (cocoyam, tannia), Typhonium trilobatum and Monstera deliciosa (Mexican breadfruit). While the aroids are little traded, and overlooked by plant breeders to the extent that the Crop Trust calls them "orphan crops", they are widely grown and are important in subsistence agriculture and in local markets. The main food product is the corm, which is high in starch; leaves and flowers also find culinary use.

See also
 List of foliage plant diseases (Araceae)

References

Further reading
 Bown, Deni (2000). Aroids: Plants of the Arum Family [ILLUSTRATED]. Timber Press. 
  online

External links

 International Aroid Society
 The Uberlist of Araceae (pdf)
 list of publications (March 2008) for Dr. h.c. Josef Bogner
 Araceae in BoDD – Botanical Dermatology Database
 Plants of the World Online by Royal Botanic Gardens, Kew

 
Alismatales families
Extant Maastrichtian first appearances